The golden-winged laughingthrush (Trochalopteron ngoclinhensis) is a species of bird in the family Timaliidae.
It is endemic to Vietnam.

Its natural habitat is subtropical or tropical moist montane forests.
It is threatened by habitat loss.

References

External links
BirdLife Species Factsheet.

Trochalopteron
Endemic birds of Vietnam
Vulnerable fauna of Asia
Birds described in 1999
Taxonomy articles created by Polbot
Taxobox binomials not recognized by IUCN